Tasha Baxter (born 2 July 1981) is a South African singer-songwriter. Baxter won "Newcomer of the Year" and "Best Pop Album" at the 14th South African Music Awards for her album "Colour Of Me".

Baxter is most well known for her debut solo studio album "Colour Of Me" on EMI South Africa and for her collaborations in Electronic dance music and Drum & Bass with multiple songs reaching number one and top positions on the Beatport charts such as "Snowblind" with Au5 and "Cloudburn" with Feed Me and on the Top 40 UK singles charts with "In the Beginning" with Roger Goode.

Early life 
Baxter was born on 2 July 1981 in Cape Town, South Africa. She learnt to play piano at a young age and sang in the school choir. At 12 years old her father taught her how to play guitar on steel twelve string guitar. She played in local bands as a teenager while developing her musical talents, playing in a Christian metal band as well as singing and performing with local drum & bass DJ's such as Counterstrike.

Career

2002–2006: In the Beginning 
When Baxter was 18 she met and became good friends with South African DJ and radio personality Roger Goode. This led to their breakthrough in the international music charts with "In the Beginning" in 2002.

"In the Beginning" made the local radio Top 40 charts and was number one on Pete Tong's Essential Mix radio show and later saw remixes by Ferry Corsten and Gabriel & Dresden.

The Ferry Corsten remix reached number 33 on the UK Singles Charts.

2006–2009: Colour of Me 
Baxter continued performing in the dance music scene and playing at local drum and bass events. She then met Noisia in 2006 and went to Holland to work on her solo album with the Dutch trio. The album was entirely written by Baxter and her co-writer Andre Scheepers. The album was signed to EMI South African division.

'Colour of Me' was released in 2007 on CD only and did not have a digital and world-wide release until 2020 provided by Universal Music Group.

Baxter toured extensively throughout this time, performing at the biggest local festivals such as Oppikoppi, Rocking the Daisies, RAMFest.

The singles from the album, "Who's Sorry Now", "The Journey", "Useless" and "Fade To Black" made the South African radio top charts list.

"The Journey" and "Don't Believe in Love" appeared in the 2009 South African film, "White Wedding".

The "Colour of Me" album was nominated for 4 South African Music Awards and won 2 with 'Best Newcomer' and 'Best Pop Album (English)'.

In October 2009 Tasha Baxter appeared on "Tropika Island of Treasure" season 2 reality gameshow on national television alongside other South African celebrities such as Trevor Noah, Loyiso Bala and was hosted by DJ Fresh.

2010–2013: Ebb and Flow, Cloudburn, Strange Behaviour 
Baxter collaborated with Jon Gooch (Feed Me, Spor) on numerous songs throughout this period. They released the drum & bass tracks "As I Need You" and "Overdue" as Spor and the dubstep tracks "Cloudburn", "Strange Behaviour" and "Ebb & Flow". "Cloudburn" reached number one on Beatport dubstep chart and was released on Deadmau5's label mau5trap.

'Ebb & Flow' was released on Feed Me's debut studio album 'Calamari Tuesday' and the album reached No. 14 on the UK Dance Albums Chart. 'Ebb & Flow' also appeared in the British TV show, "Youngers".

In 2011, Baxter independently released her 'Ebb & Flow' EP which was produced by Jon which contained the original songs "Ebb & Flow", "Bikes" and "Fake the Fall".

2014–2019: Snowblind, Bigger than Me 
In 2014, Baxter met Au5 and the song '"Snowblind" was created. Tasha wrote and performed vocals for the song and it was released on Canadian electronic record label Monstercat. "Snowblind" reached number one on the Beatport dubstep charts and also appeared on the American TV show, "So You Think You Can Dance". The following year, she independently released "Bigger than Me" with Au5 as producer which has over one million streams on Spotify.

In 2016, she was featured again on Monstercat with Tut Tut Child on the song "Just A Dream".

In 2017 the song, "The Journey" from Baxter's album "Colour Of Me" was sampled in Lil Wayne's "Hittas" on his "Tha Carter V" studio album.

During this period, Baxter continued with collaborations and recordings in the Electronic dance music and Drum & Bass with releases such as "Saviour" by Flux Pavilion on Circus Records and "The Wall" by Abis & Signal/Imanu and with Minesweepa on "FACES" and "Stargate" with Au5 on his "Divinorum" album.

2020–present: Polyoto 
In 2020, Baxter started streaming on Twitch during lockdown. During her streams she and her Twitch community created the collaborative album 'FULL MOON FLEX' which was released in 2021 by her record label Polyoto.

In 2021, Baxter collaborated with Feed Me again, performing 'Reckless' on his self titled studio album 'Feed Me' released on Sotto Voce. Later in 2021, Baxter collaborated with Moore Kismet on their song 'Call of the Unicorn' released on Thrive.

Discography

Studio albums

Selected singles as lead artist

References

Living people
1981 births
South African women singer-songwriters